Simon-Charles Miger (Nemours, 19 February 1736 – Paris, 28 February 1828) was a French engraver, most notable for the plates he produced for La Ménagerie du Muséum national d'histoire naturelle by Lacépède, Saint-Hilaire and Cuvier.

Life and work
Son of a tanner who sent him to study in Paris, Miger took various jobs including teacher, tutor and secretary before discovering a passion for engraving. He apprenticed to Charles Nicolas Cochin, which employed him as a clerk, and attended the workshop of Johann Georg Wille. He developed into a portraitist, and then fell in love with a woman with whom he courted for four years until his situation finally allow her to marry him. In 1778, Miger was accredited by the Académie royale de peinture et de sculpture, where he was admitted as a member in 1781. During the French Revolution, he argued alongside Jean-Michel Moreau and Adélaïde Labille-Guiard for the renovation of the statutes that were falling into disrepair. "The laws of the state, he says, are granted by the French people, those of the Academy shall be through all académicien people." But these reform proposals were rendered obsolete by the abolition of Academies, decreed by the National Convention in 1795. In 1800, Miger is charged with Bernard Germain de Lacépède to engrave the planks of his work on the menagerie of the National Museum of Natural History. He then continues to handle the chisel and compose verses until the age of nearly 90 years.

Galleries

Menagerie

Portraits

Iconography
 
Émile Bellier de La Chavignerie, Biographie et catalogue de l'œuvre du graveur Miger, membre de l'ancienne Académie royale de peinture et de sculpture, son portrait avec fac-similé de son écriture (1856).
Bernard-Germain-Étienne de Lacépède, Georges Cuvier, Étienne Geoffroy Saint-Hilaire, La Ménagerie du Muséum national d'histoire naturelle, ou Description et histoire des animaux qui y vivent et qui y ont vécu (2 volumes, 1804). Reissue : Artis Library Committee, Amsterdam, 1981. Engravings online

1736 births
1828 deaths
18th-century engravers
19th-century engravers
French engravers
Animal artists